The Entrance Road at Devils Tower National Monument, officially known as Wyoming Highway 110, is a  scenic road that provides the approach to the Devil's Tower eminence, affording planned views to arriving visitors.

Route description

The Wyoming Highway 110 designation is a short  roadway that starts its at Wyoming Highway 24 and travels west to the Devils Tower National Monument Entrance. Mileposts along WYO 110 increase from east to west.

The road provides access to the monument's primary developed areas, such as headquarters and visitor center.

History
The road was originally constructed in 1917 with an eight percent grade and a ford at the Belle Fourche River. A bridge was built in 1928, and the road was extensively altered in the 1930s with labor from the Civilian Conservation Corps, improving grades and alignments. CCC camp NM-1 remained at Devil's Tower from 1935 to 1938. A complete loop was planned by the National Park Service Engineering Division in 1927, but was never carried out. The entrance road at Devils Tower is listed on the National Register of Historic Places as an example of close integration with the natural surroundings.

Much of the CCC work involved realignment of the existing road and the careful obliteration of the old alignment, using young trees and sod stockpiled during construction of the new alignment.

Major intersections

See also

 Entrance Station (Devils Tower National Monument)
 Old Headquarters Area Historic District
 Tower Ladder (Devils Tower National Monument)

References

External links

National Park Service Devils Tower First Fifty Years: The Early Years
Devils Tower Entrance Road at Wyoming State Historic Preservation Office

National Register of Historic Places in Devils Tower National Monument
Roads on the National Register of Historic Places in Wyoming
Transportation in Crook County, Wyoming
Civilian Conservation Corps in Wyoming
1917 establishments in Wyoming
National Park Service rustic in Wyoming